Julie is an Indian Hindi erotic film produced by N. R. Pachisia and directed by Deepak Shivdasani. The film stars Neha Dhupia, Priyanshu Chatterjee, Yash Tonk, Sanjay Kapoor and Achint Kaur. It is available on Rajshri Channel of YouTube. and on the Disney+hotstar app.

Its sequel, Julie 2, starring Raai Laxmi, also directed by Deepak Shivdasani was released on 24 November 2017, after legal issues.

Plot
When Julie (Neha Dhupia), a girl next door from Goa, gets dumped by her boyfriend, Neil (Yash Tonk), she moves to Mumbai. There, she gets intimate with her boss, Rohan (Sanjay Kapoor). Heartbroken and emotionless, she loses faith in love and decides to become a call girl. A chance meeting with Mihir Shandilya (Priyanshu Chatterjee), a multi-millionaire and one of the most eligible bachelors in town, leads to their instant liking for each other. Mihir is completely besotted by her beauty and, being a family-oriented man, proposes marriage to her. All is well except that Mihir and his family are unaware of the fact that Julie is a high-profile prostitute. During a TV interview, Mihir surprises everyone by mentioning Julie is the 'someone special' in his life. Julie is now in a dilemma. How she tells her future husband about her socially unacceptable profession and if Mihir accepts her forms the rest of the story.

Cast 
 Neha Dhupia as Julie
 Priyanshu Chatterjee as Mihir Shandilya
 Yash Tonk as Neil
 Sanjay Kapoor as Rohan
 Achint Kaur as Tara Aggarwal
 Anil Nagrath as Vishal (Editor-in-Chief of D Network)
 Manish Khanna as Naidu (CEO of C TV)
 Sudhir Joshi as Father of Julie
 Brij Gopal as Mr. Malhotra
 Donny Bharadwaj as Sonia Shandilya, Mihir's sister
 Master Vishal Gulati as Sunny Shandilya
 Shiva Rindani
 Ahmed Khan 
 Ishwar Patel as Mihir's Uncle
 Kamini Khanna as Mrs. Shandilya, Mihir's mother
 Rishikesh Sharma as Rishi Nair

Soundtrack

All songs composed by Himesh Reshammiya and written by Sameer.

References

External links 
 

2004 films
2000s Hindi-language films
Indian erotic drama films
Films scored by Himesh Reshammiya
Indian erotic romance films
Films about sexual abuse
Films about prostitution in India
Films about women in India
Films directed by Deepak Shivdasani